2727 Kirby is a 30-story, 78 unit, condominium high rise, designed by Ziegler Cooper and located in Upper Kirby just south of Westheimer in Houston, Texas.

Zoned schools
Residents of this building are zoned to schools in the Houston Independent School District. They are zoned to Poe Elementary School, Lanier Middle School, and Lamar High School.

Defective construction lawsuit
Kirby Tower LP filed a lawsuit against the developer citing defective construction repair costs. Problems included a glass falling out of place and landing on a vehicle below as well as defective glass railing on individual balconies, and problems with heating and air, fire sprinklers, plumbing, electrical systems and waterproofing.

As of 2014 all problems have been rectified.

See also

List of tallest buildings in Houston
List of tallest buildings in Texas

References

External links

2727 Kirby — official site

Residential buildings completed in 2009
Residential skyscrapers in Houston
Residential condominiums in the United States
2009 establishments in Texas